Twin Peaks is an American television series, running from 1990 to 1991; and in 2017.

Twin Peaks may also refer to:

Entertainment 
 Twin Peaks: Fire Walk with Me, a 1992 film based on the American television series
 Twin Peaks (album), a 1974 album by hard rock band Mountain
 Plays the Music of Twin Peaks, a 2016 album by Xiu Xiu
 Twin Peaks (band), a Chicago-based rock band
 "Twin Peaks", a song by the band Surfer Blood from their 2010 album Astro Coast

Mountains 
 Double summit, a type of mountain or hill with two summits

Canada 
 Twin Peaks (British Columbia), two summits on Vancouver Island
 The Twins massif, North Twin Peak and South Twin Peak in the Canadian Rockies

United States 
 Twin Peaks (Alaska), Chugach Mountains
 Twin Peaks (Oregon), in the Wallowa Mountains
 Twin Peaks (Wyoming), in the Wind River Range

California 
 Twin Peaks (Placer County, California), near Lake Tahoe
 Twin Peaks (San Francisco), two high hills close to Midtown Terrace
 Twin Peaks (Santa Clara County, California), in the foothills west of Morgan Hill
 Twin Peaks (Sequoia National Park)
 Twin Peaks (Yosemite), in Yosemite National Park

Colorado 
 Twin Sisters Peaks, in Larimer County
 Joint name of Longs Peak and Mount Meeker, in Rocky Mountain National Park

Nevada 
 Twin Peaks (Churchill County, Nevada)
 Twin Peaks (Elko County, Nevada), twin mountain summits northwest of Elko, in the Adobe Range

Utah 
 American Fork Twin Peaks, on the Alpine Ridge within the Wasatch Range
 Broads Fork Twin Peaks, on the Cottonwood Ridge within the Wasatch Range
 Avenues Twin Peaks, within the Wasatch Range foothills

Other mountains 
 Twin Peaks (Antarctica)
 Two hills near the Mars Pathfinder landing site in Ares Vallis

Other uses 
 Twin Peaks, California, an unincorporated community in San Bernardino County, California
 Twin Peaks Tavern, historic LGBT bar in San Francisco, California
 Twin Peaks (restaurant chain), a chain based in Dallas, Texas
 Twin Peaks, a chocolate bar similar to Toblerone sold by UK retailer Poundland